The Qatar Ladies Open, currently sponsored by TotalEnergies and called the Qatar TotalEnergies Open, is a women's tennis tournament held in Doha, Qatar. Held since 2001, this WTA Tour event was a Tier I-tournament in 2008, and was played on outdoor hardcourts. After a two-year break the tournament returned in 2011 and is held at the Khalifa International Tennis and Squash Complex.

History
The first tournament was held in 2001 as Qatar Total FinaElf Open for the prize money of $170,000, as a Tier III tournament. In 2004, the tournament got Tier II category because of an increase in prize money to $585,000, and in 2007 to $600,000. For the 2008 season, which was the last season it was held, the tournament became Tier I for the prize money of $2,500,000. The event then took a two-year break due to the venue hosting the WTA Tour Championship, thus not being played in 2009 or 2010. The tournament returned in 2011 as a Premier Event with the prize money of $721,000 and a 32-competitor singles draw (16-pair doubles draw). The tournament received Premier 5 status from 2012 to 2014, but in the 2015 WTA Season the tournament was back to a Premier event. It then switched back to being a Premier 5 tournament in 2016, when the Dubai Tennis Championships was downgraded to Premier. Now, the two tournaments alternate between Premier 5 and Premier status every year.

The event is held at the Khalifa International Tennis and Squash Complex which currently has a capacity of 6,911. It was originally much smaller but had a makeover in 2008. Its prize money as of 2016 was $2,517,250 and the tournament director is Saad Al Mohannadi.

Past finals

Singles

Doubles

See also
List of tennis tournaments
WTA Tier I tournaments
WTA Tour Championships
ATP Qatar Open

References

External links

Qatar Total Open. WTA Tour profile.

 
Tennis tournaments in Qatar
Hard court tennis tournaments
WTA Tour
Recurring sporting events established in 2001
Recurring events disestablished in 2008
Winter events in Qatar